This is a list of local, regional, national and international television channels and radio stations owned by the British Broadcasting Corporation (BBC) in the United Kingdom and around the world.

List of television channels
In the UK, as well as on Freeview, satellite and cable services, the BBC's licence-funded television channels and their programmes can be watched live and on demand via BBC iPlayer. They can also be seen in Ireland and some parts of mainland Europe.

National

Regional

Local (England)

List of UKTV channels
UKTV is a multichannel broadcaster ran under BBC Studios, therefore, the channels are not funded by the television licence.

List of international television channels
Commercially funded BBC Studios and BBC Global News, as well as state-funded BBC World Service operate and distribute these linear television services around the world. These services are not to be confused with the domestic channels operated in the United Kingdom and accessible in the Republic of Ireland.

List of national radio stations

List of regional radio stations

Scotland
BBC Radio Scotland – A radio station for all things Scotland.
BBC Radio nan Gàidheal – A Scottish Gaelic language radio station.
BBC Radio Orkney – A part-time radio station for Orkney which opts out of Radio Scotland.
BBC Radio Shetland – A part-time radio station for Shetland which opts out of Radio Scotland.

Wales
BBC Radio Wales – A radio station for all things Wales.
BBC Radio Cymru – A Welsh language radio station.
BBC Radio Cymru 2 – A part-time Welsh language radio station which opts out at breakfast time from Radio Cymru.

Northern Ireland
BBC Radio Ulster – A radio station for all things Northern Ireland.
BBC Radio Foyle – A part-time station covering Derry which opts out of Radio Ulster.

List of local radio stations

East
BBC Essex 
BBC Radio Cambridgeshire 
BBC Radio Norfolk 
BBC Radio Northampton – Northamptonshire
BBC Radio Suffolk 
BBC Three Counties Radio – Bedfordshire, Buckinghamshire and Hertfordshire

East Midlands
BBC Radio Derby – all but the northern part of Derbyshire and eastern Staffordshire
BBC Radio Leicester – Leicestershire and Rutland
BBC Radio Nottingham – Nottinghamshire

London
BBC Radio London – Greater London

North East and Cumbria
BBC Radio Newcastle – Tyne and Wear, Northumberland and the northern part of County Durham
BBC Radio Tees – Teesside and the southern part of County Durham
BBC Radio Cumbria

North West
BBC Radio Lancashire 
BBC Radio Manchester – Greater Manchester, north east Cheshire and north west Derbyshire
BBC Radio Merseyside – Merseyside and north and west Cheshire

South
BBC Radio Berkshire – Berkshire and north Hampshire
BBC Radio Oxford – Oxfordshire
BBC Radio Solent – mid and south Hampshire, Dorset and the Isle of Wight

South East
BBC Radio Kent 
BBC Radio Surrey – Surrey, northern West Sussex and north east Hampshire
BBC Radio Sussex – East and West Sussex

South West
BBC Radio Cornwall – Cornwall and the Isles of Scilly
BBC Radio Devon 
BBC Radio Guernsey – Guernsey, Alderney, Herm and Sark
BBC Radio Jersey

West
BBC Radio Bristol – Bristol, Bath, North Somerset and South Gloucestershire
BBC Radio Gloucestershire
BBC Radio Somerset
BBC Radio Wiltshire

West Midlands
BBC CWR – Coventry and Warwickshire
BBC Hereford & Worcester
BBC Radio Shropshire
BBC Radio Stoke – north and mid Staffordshire, north east Shropshire and south Cheshire
BBC Radio WM – Birmingham, the West Midlands and southern Staffordshire

Yorkshire
BBC Radio Leeds – Leeds, Bradford and West Yorkshire
BBC Radio Sheffield – Sheffield, South Yorkshire and north east Derbyshire
BBC Radio York – North Yorkshire

Yorkshire and Lincolnshire
BBC Radio Humberside – Kingston-upon-Hull, the East Riding of Yorkshire and north Lincolnshire
BBC Radio Lincolnshire

List of former TV channels and radio stations

Television
 BBC Two Scotland
 BBC 2W
 BBC Choice
 BBC Knowledge
 BBC HD
 BBC World Service Television
 BBC Prime
 BBC TV Europe
 BBC Japan
 BBC Food 
 BBC Knowledge (international) 
 BBC Kids
 BBC Canada

Radio

National stations
 BBC Home Service
 BBC National Programme
 BBC Light Programme
 BBC Regional Programme
 BBC Third Programme
 BBC Radio 5 (former)
 Radio 4 News FM

Regional stations
 BBC Radio Clwyd
 BBC Radio Gwent

Local stations
BBC Dorset FM
BBC Radio Durham
BBC Radio Furness
BBC Radio Swindon
BBC Southern Counties Radio
BBC Thames Valley FM

BBC Television
BBC Radio
BBC-related lists